Will Anderson (born September 13, 1984) is a Scrabble player who won the North American Scrabble Championship in 2017, winning 25 out of 31 games, finishing ahead of runner-up Mack Meller. Anderson is currently rated 2128 as of June 2020, ranking him first in North America in the OWL word source.

Personal life
Anderson is from Croton-on-Hudson, New York. Outside Scrabble, he works as a textbook editor.

References

External links

American Scrabble players
People from Croton-on-Hudson, New York
1984 births
Living people
American book editors